is a Japanese manga artist.  She is best known for the series Mushishi, for which she received an Excellence Prize for manga at the 2003 Japan Media Arts Festival and the 2006 Kodansha Manga Award for general manga. She is also known by the pen name .

Works 
Bio Luminescence (1997) — A compilation of short works. Later included in Filament.
Mushishi (1999–2008, Kodansha, 10 volumes) — Published in Afternoon Season Zōkan and Monthly Afternoon. Adapted into an anime television series.
Filament (2004) – A compilation of short works, which includes the stories in Bio Luminescence and two other stories.
Suiiki (2009–2010, Kodansha, 2 volumes) — Published in Monthly Afternoon.
Mushishi Special: Sun-Eating Shade (2013) — Two-chapter special published in Monthly Afternoon.
When a Cat Faces West (2018–2020, Kodansha, 3 volumes) — Published in Monthly Afternoon.

References 

1974 births
Female comics writers
Japanese female comics artists
Japanese women writers
Living people
Manga artists from Yamaguchi Prefecture
Winner of Kodansha Manga Award (General)
Women manga artists
21st-century pseudonymous writers
Pseudonymous artists
Pseudonymous women writers